Makindu Airport is an airport in Makindu, Kenya.

Location
Makindu Airport  is located in Makueni County, in the town of Makindu, in southeastern Kenya, on the Nairobi-Mombasa Highway.

The geographic coordinates of this airport are:2° 17' 33.00"S, +37° 49' 36.00"E (Latitude:-2.292500; Longitude:37.826667).

Overview
Makindu Airport is a small airport that serves the town of Makindu and the adjacent communities.

Airlines and destinations
At the moment there are no regular, scheduled airline services to Makindu Airport.

See also
 Makindu
 Makueni County
 Eastern Province (Kenya)
 Kenya Airports Authority
 Kenya Civil Aviation Authority
 List of airports in Kenya

References

External links
  Location of Makindu Airport At Google Maps
  Website of Kenya Airports Authority
  Airkenya Flight Routes
 

Airports in Kenya
Eastern Province (Kenya)
Makueni County